Notarcha is a genus of moths of the family Crambidae described by Edward Meyrick in 1884.

Species
Notarcha aurolinealis (Walker, 1859)
Notarcha auroralis (Moore, 1888)
Notarcha butyrina Meyrick, 1886
Notarcha cassusalis (Walker, 1859)
Notarcha chrysoplasta Meyrick, 1884
Notarcha digitalis J. C. Shaffer & Munroe, 2007
Notarcha halurga Meyrick, 1886
Notarcha homomorpha Meyrick, 1894
Notarcha muscerdalis Zeller, 1852
Notarcha nigrofimbrialis (Snellen, 1880)
Notarcha obrinusalis (Walker, 1859)
Notarcha pactolica (Butler, 1887)
Notarcha polytimeta (Turner, 1915)
Notarcha quaternalis (Zeller, 1852)
Notarcha recurrens (Moore, 1888)
Notarcha stigmatalis Warren, 1896
Notarcha temeratalis (Zeller, 1852)
Notarcha viettalis (Marion, 1956)

Former species
Notarcha penthodes Meyrick, 1902

References

Spilomelinae
Crambidae genera
Taxa named by Edward Meyrick